Events from the year 1949 in Scotland.

Incumbents 

 Secretary of State for Scotland and Keeper of the Great Seal – Arthur Woodburn

Law officers 
 Lord Advocate – John Thomas Wheatley
 Solicitor General for Scotland – Douglas Johnston

Judiciary 
 Lord President of the Court of Session and Lord Justice General – Lord Cooper
 Lord Justice Clerk – Lord Thomson
 Chairman of the Scottish Land Court – Lord Gibson

Events 
 3 April – Trolleybuses in Glasgow introduced.
 1 May – Scottish Gas Board established.
 4 May – Fire at Grafton's fashion store in Argyle Street, Glasgow, kills 13 young women.
 24 July – People of Alyth march on Alyth Hill to assert their right of commonty over the land.
 October – The Scottish Covenant, calling for the establishment of a legislative parliament within the United Kingdom, is drawn up by John MacCormick.

Undated 
 Wendy Wood founds the nationalist group, the Scottish Patriots
 The Law Society of Scotland is established.
 John Boyd Orr receives the Nobel Peace Prize.

Births 
 15 January – Craig Pritchett, chess International Master
 19 January – Lindsay Roy, educator and politician
 23 January – Tom Forsyth, international footballer
 25 January – Chris Lowe, BBC News presenter
 2 February – Duncan Bannatyne, entrepreneur, philanthropist and author 
 9 February – Bernard Gallacher, golfer
 26 February – Lynda Clark, judge and politician
 6 March – Martin Buchan, international footballer
 7 March – Malcolm Chisholm, Labour MSP
 12 March – Glenn Chandler playwright, novelist, producer and theatre director
 13 March – Trevor Sorbie, hairdresser
 8 April – Alex Fergusson, Presiding Officer of the Scottish Parliament 2007–2011 (died 2018)
 25 April – Alexis Jay, social worker
 21 May – Andrew Neil, print and television journalist
 4 June – Lou Macari, international footballer and manager
 4 July – Alex Miller, footballer and manager
 6 August – Erich Schaedler, footballer (suicide 1985)
 8 August – Benny Young, actor
 11 August – Ian Charleson, actor (died 1990)
 12 August – Mark Knopfler, musician with Dire Straits
 20 August – Stewart Houston, international footballer and manager
 9 September – John Reid, music manager
 18 September – Alastair Campbell, Lord Bracadale, judge
 22 September – Jimmy Bone, footballer and manager
 29 September – Adrian Elrick, international footballer representing New Zealand
 8 October – Hamish Stuart, guitarist, bassist, singer, composer and record producer
 22 November - Paul le Page Barnett science fiction writer, with pen name John Grant (died 2020)
 25 November – Isabel Hilton, journalist and broadcaster
 28 December – Hilton McRae, actor
 Alison Kinnaird, glass sculptor and harpist

Deaths 
 2 January – Sir Victor Fortune, British Army officer (born 1883)
 9 January – Edward Baird, artist (born 1904) 
 12 April
 W. Lindsay Cable, artist and illustrator (born 1900)
 John Wallace, Liberal MP (born 1868)
 3 August – Jessie M. King, illustrator and designer (born 1875)
 6 August – David Taylor, footballer and manager (born 1883)
 7 October - Arthur Pillans Laurie, chemist (born 1861)
 22 October – Alex McDonald, footballer (born 1878)
 Joseph Lee, poet and journalist (born 1876)

Sport 
 Summer – The Ba game of Duns revived.

See also 
 1949 in Northern Ireland

References 

 
Years of the 20th century in Scotland
Scotland
1940s in Scotland